Kanchenjunga Express is a 2012 Indian Bengali film directed by Arnab Ghosh. It was Ghosh's début. Kanchenjunga Express is a woman-centric film that unfolds in a train with a lot of suspense. The music is scored by Souvik Gupta and has songs by  Rupam Islam, Usha Uthup and Kunal Ganjawala.

Plot 
Kanchenjunga Express is a suspense thriller revolving the life of Nandini, an NGO worker. Nandini is a simple kind-hearted woman, married to the wrong kind of men and exploited because of her simplicity. She has learned many good lessons from the experiences of her life, and thus she is tough, strong and independent.

The film shows three situations of Nandini's life and how she faces them.

Cast 
 Mumtaz Sorcar as Nandini
 Sabyasachi Chakrabarty
 Rajatava Dutta
 Kanchan Mullick
 Bratya Basu
 Angshuman Gupta
 Jaya Seal

References 

2012 films
Indian thriller films
Indian detective films
Bengali-language Indian films
2010s Bengali-language films
2012 thriller films